Florida State College may refer to:

Florida State College at Jacksonville, a state college in Jacksonville, Florida, U.S.
Florida State University, previously known as Florida State College and Florida State College for Women